Cara Gee (born July 18, 1983) is a Canadian film, television, and stage actress. She is known for her roles in the television series Strange Empire and The Expanse. She is described by Forbes as "one of the most prominent indigenous women in the entertainment industry".

Career
Gee is primarily known as a stage actress in Toronto, Ontario, where her acting credits have included productions of Margaret Atwood's The Penelopiad, Daniel MacIvor's Arigato, Tokyo, Tomson Highway's The Rez Sisters Cliff Cardinal's Stitch, Birdtown and Swanville's 36 Little Plays About Hopeless Girls and Louise Dupré's Tout comme elle.

She made her feature film debut in Empire of Dirt for which she was nominated for a Canadian Screen Award. For this role, she also won a Special Jury award at the 2013 Toronto International Film Festival as well as an award for Best Actress at the American Indian Film Festival. In 2013, at TIFF, Gee was named one of the festival's annual Rising Stars.

Gee began work on television playing guest roles in the television series King and Republic of Doyle. In 2014, she starred as one of the lead characters in the Western drama series Strange Empire on CBC Television, for one season until it was cancelled in 2015. As of 2016, Gee stars in the 33-episode web series Inhuman Condition, which airs on the KindaTV YouTube channel.  

From 2017 to 2023 she played the role of Camina Drummer on the Syfy/Amazon television series The Expanse. Her indigenous origin has attracted media attention repeatedly around matters of representation of minorities, especially with narratives in The Expanse regarding cultural assimilation.

Personal life
Gee is Ojibwe, one of the largest indigenous populations in Canada. She was born in Calgary, Alberta, and raised in Aurora, Ontario. She married Richard de Klerk in 2019. Gee was eight months pregnant while filming the fifth season of The Expanse.

Filmography

Awards and nominations 
Gee garnered a Canadian Screen Award nomination for Best Actress at the 2nd Canadian Screen Awards for her performance in Empire of Dirt. For this role, she also won a Special Jury Award at the 2013 Toronto International Film Festival as well as an award for Best Actress at the American Indian Film Festival.

References

External links
 

Canadian film actresses
Canadian television actresses
Canadian stage actresses
First Nations actresses
Actresses from Calgary
Ojibwe people
Living people
21st-century Canadian actresses
21st-century First Nations people
1983 births